Offenhausen is a municipality in the Austrian state of Upper Austria in the district Wels-Land.
It gained the official right to hold markets in 1534 from King Ferdinand I.

Population

References

External links
 - Official website

Cities and towns in Wels-Land District
1534 establishments in Austria
Establishments in the Archduchy of Austria